Charlie Dixon may refer to:

Charlie Dixon (musician) (1898–1940), jazz banjoist
Charlie Dixon (English footballer, born 1891) (1891 – after 1926), Darlington, Middlesbrough and Hartlepool full back
Charlie Dixon (English footballer, born 1903) (1903–1983), Bournemouth, Southport and Nelson centre half
Charlie Dixon (Australian footballer) (born 1990)

See also
Charley Dixon, fictional character in Terminator
Charles Dixon (disambiguation)